Camarones is a barrio in the municipality of Guaynabo, Puerto Rico. Its population in 2010 was 5,626.

History
The name  meaning "shrimp" in English comes from the Camarones River.

Puerto Rico was ceded by Spain in the aftermath of the Spanish–American War under the terms of the Treaty of Paris of 1898 and became an unincorporated territory of the United States. In 1899, the United States Department of War conducted a census of Puerto Rico finding that the population of Camarones barrio was 620.

Sectors
Barrios (which are roughly comparable to minor civil divisions) in turn are further subdivided into smaller local populated place areas/units called sectores (sectors in English). The types of sectores may vary, from normally sector to urbanización to reparto to barriada to residencial, among others.

The following sectors are in Camarones barrio:

Crime
Carjackings are a problem in Guaynabo, Puerto Rico and the FBI is the jurisdiction involved in investigations of carjackings in Puerto Rico.

Notable people
Several notable musicians have come out of Camarones barrio in Guaynabo including: Juan Pablo Rosario, the Morales brothers (Ramito, Moralito, Luisito and Casito) who were troubadours. Angel Alfonso Cruz "Alfonsillo", musician and troubadour singer. Vitín Cruz "El Canario", brother of "Alfonsillo" also a good troubadour, Toño León, Willie Berrios and Elvis Crespo, who sings Merengue.

See also

 List of communities in Puerto Rico
 List of barrios and sectors of Guaynabo, Puerto Rico

References

External links

Barrios of Guaynabo, Puerto Rico
Guaynabo, Puerto Rico